Apigetrin is a chemical compound that can be found in dandelion coffee and in Teucrium gnaphalodes.

References

External links 
 Apigetrin on chemlink.com

Flavone glucosides